HM Trawler Alvis was a British trawler that was taken up from trade and used by the Royal Navy during the  Second World War. She was returned to the fishing industry at the end of hostilities in 1945.

Pre-War Career

6 Nov 1918:   Launched by Ailsa Shipbuilding Company at Ayr, for The Admiralty as Peter Hall.
1919:           Registered by The Admiralty in the Registry of British Ships at London.
24 Aug 1920: Registered by The Admiralty as a fishing vessel at London.
Nov 1924: Sold to Société Anonyme Armement Ostendais, Ostend.
29 Nov 1924: Registered at Ostend as Transport Union.
27 Dec 1935: Rescued crew of fourteen of Dutch trawler Cornelia Maria (SCH135) which was sinking. 
1939: Sold to Saint Andrew's Steam Fishing Co Ltd, Hull.
1 Mar 1939: Registered at Hull as Alvis (H52). Fishing from Fleetwood.

Early World War II

On the 18 Sept 1939, just after the start of WW2, the Alvis was fishing in the vicinity of St Kilda. At about 1.20pm a shot was heard and a large spout of water erupted close to the Alvis. The skipper and crew then spotted a German submarine. The skipper, Albert Thomason, was signalled from the U Boat and instructed to abandon his vessel. The small lifeboat was launched and the crew left the Alvis. The lifeboat pulled alongside the submarine, the U-35,  and the commander, Werner Lott, asked for the captain of the Alvis. Thomason went aboard the submarine and, on the conning tower, Lott extended his hand in welcome. He then said, " I am sorry but I will have to sink your ship" and asked Skipper Thomason if there were anymore crew aboard the Alvis. The crew and Lott, all speaking very good English, handed cigarettes to the Alvis crew, and then ordered them back to their vessel.  Lott sent a working party over to Alvis under the command of a Lieutenant. On their arrival, they threw the wireless overboard and then chopped away the fishing gear and smashed the dynamo in the engine room. The Lieutenant asked Thomason if he could take a lifebelt as a souvenir, which he did. However, Lott gave Thomason a bottle of gin in return with his compliments.

No provisions or the fish caught were taken from the Alvis by the Germans. The reason the U-Boat commander did not sink the Alvis was that, in his opinion, the 13-man crew would never make it back to shore in their lifeboat. The Alvis returned unharmed to her homeport of Fleetwood, but that same day the U-Boat commander found 3 other Fleetwood vessels. They were the Arlita, the Lord Minto, and the Nancy Hague. After removing the crews from the Arlita and Lord Minto onto the Nancy Hague, the U-35 sank the two empty ships. The three crews returned to Fleetwood aboard the Nancy Hague.  
The Alvis was subsequently requisitioned in 1940 by the Admiralty. Werner Lott was taken prisoner of war aboard HMS Kingston, with all of his crew, after he scuttled his U-boat on 29 November 1939.

U-35's Account of Events

The fishing trawler Alvis was the first British ship U-35 encountered in the North Atlantic. She allowed Alvis to pass unharmed on 18 September 1939, after realising that the thirteen man crew could never have reached land in the available lifeboat. In return, the British captain warned U-35 that the Royal Navy aircraft carrier Ark Royal was in the general area.

The following details were extracted from U-35's war diary:
 Name and size of the vessel: "St. Alvis", 271 Br T
 Name of owner: unknown
 Port of registry: Hull
 Port of departure : Fleetwood
 Destination port: Fleetwood
 Flag visible: none

"The steamer is of enemy origin. He should be destroyed, because confiscation is not possible. His operation area was far away from the coast and because of that he could not be considered a "coastal fishery vessel". The fish catching equipment and the radio were thrown overboard. The crew of 13 which had already embarked into the rescue boat was advised to get back onto the ship, because the freeboard of it was already very narrow and was not considered seaworthy. The steamer was dismissed. There were no attempts to escape or other resistance."

Naval Service

Alvis was requisitioned for war service as an anti submarine trawler, on 30 Apr 1940. She was given the pennant number 4118 and the Admiralty paid a hire rate of £84.0.0d per month. Alvis was given one 12pdr gun as her main armament and assigned to the Royal Naval Patrol Service.

Alvis was fitted out as a minesweeper in May 1941, and from January 1942 she was based at Hartlepool with M/S Group 148.  She took part in the minesweeping operations that were vital to the success and safety of the Allied landings in Normandy in 1944:

Fate
Alvis was returned to civilian service just before the end of the war in Europe in Mar 1945.  She was then owned by a number of companies including:  Ocean Steam Trawling Co Ltd, Milford Fisheries Ltd, Boston Deep Sea Fisheries Ltd, and Argosy Trawling Co Ltd of Fleetwood.  Alvis was eventually scrapped at Barrow-in-Furness in 1954.

Footnotes

References
 
 Fleetwood Maritime Heritage Trust

External links
hulltrawler.net - ALVIS H52
The Bosun's Watch - S.T. Alvis FD46
 ROYAL NAVY SHIPS, January 1942
Details of the encounter between U-35 and Alvis on U-35.com

Naval trawlers of the United Kingdom
World War I naval ships of the United Kingdom
World War II naval ships of the United Kingdom
World War II merchant ships of the United Kingdom
1918 ships